Bartha van Crimpen (1754–1818), was a Dutch patriot. She became a national symbol and impersonated "Freedom" in the inauguration of the first national parliament of the Batavian Republic 3 March 1796.

She was the daughter of Adrianus van Crimpen (1715–1799) and Maria Clasina van Doorschot (d. 1775) and married in 1775 to the official Ary van der Meer (1753–1805). She and her spouse were joint members in the Patriottentijd and leaders of the society ‘Voor ’t Vaderland’ in Haag. They were forced to flee to France from the organists in 1787 and returned in 1795.

References 
 Crimpen, Bartha Maria van, in: Digitaal Vrouwenlexicon van Nederland. URL: http://resources.huygens.knaw.nl/vrouwenlexicon/lemmata/data/VanderMeer [13/01/2014]

1754 births
1818 deaths
18th-century Dutch people